Nicholas Paul Dallon Braithwaite (born 26 August 1939, London) is an English conductor.  He is the son of the conductor Warwick Braithwaite.

Biography
Braithwaite studied at the Royal Academy of Music, at the Festival masterclasses in Bayreuth, and with Hans Swarowsky in Vienna.  In the 1960s, Braithwaite was associate conductor of the Bournemouth Symphony Orchestra.  He served as resident conductor at Sadler's Wells Opera for three seasons, from 1971 to 1974, where he conducted Richard Wagner's Ring cycle.  In 1976, he was named music director of Glyndebourne Touring Opera., and served in that post until 1980.  With the Manchester Camerata, Braithwaite was principal guest conductor from 1977 to 1984, and principal conductor from 1984 to 1991.  He has served as principal guest conductor of the Norwegian Radio Orchestra. He has made recordings with orchestras such as the London Philharmonic, London Symphony and Philharmonia orchestras. He was named musical director and chief conductor of Gothenburg's Stora Teatern in 1981, and served there until 1984.

In Australia, Braithwaite was principal conductor of the Adelaide Symphony Orchestra, from 1987 to 1991, and also held the same post with the Tasmanian Symphony Orchestra.  Braithwaite has also served as the Dean of Music at the Victorian College of the Arts from 1988 to 1991.

Braithwaite married Gillian Agnes Haggarty in August 1985.  They have one daughter (Dr Felicity Braithwaite) and one son (Christopher Braithwaite).

References

External links
 Official homepage of Nicholas Braithwaite
 Tennant Artists agency page on Nicholas Braithwaite

1939 births
Living people
English conductors (music)
British male conductors (music)
Alumni of the Royal Academy of Music
University of Music and Performing Arts Vienna alumni
21st-century British conductors (music)
21st-century British male musicians
Nicholas